The Pet Travel Scheme ("PETS") is a system which allows animals to travel easily between member countries without undergoing quarantine. A pet passport is a document that officially records information related to a specific animal, as part of that procedure. The effect is to drastically speed up and simplify travel with and transport of animals between member countries, compared to previous procedures if the regulations are followed.

History
On 1 October 2001, the European Union introduced the PETS scheme, under which animals from any member country may freely travel to any other member country on approved carriers.

Over time the EU scheme has recognised other countries, such as Australia, Canada, New Zealand and the United States as listed countries, relaxing some of the entry requirements for pets travelling from these countries.

Appearance 
The pet passport itself comes in multiple forms, sometimes a pink A4 sheet, sometimes a small blue booklet. It contains the microchip or the tattoo number of the animal, the certification that the animal has had a rabies vaccination, and needs to be signed by an officially approved veterinarian.

A new style passport with laminated strips and additional security measures was introduced in the UK in December 2014. Old style passports remain valid.

The passport is not to be confused with a much smaller folder routinely issued by vets, which records the complete vaccination history of the pet.

Details of procedure 
Every country has different requirements, both for export and import of animals, although some features are common to all.

Requirements 
 Subcutaneous (below the skin) microchip implant that meets the International Society of Pharmacovigilance (SoP) specification.
 Certified rabies vaccination and results from a blood serology test to confirm the presence of rabies antibodies. For pet travel in Europe, the rabies vaccine should be administered by a veterinarian with a minimum of 21 days before travel. Some countries may differ and always check with your local veterinarian for the procedures to follow.
Proof of treatment for ticks, fleas and tapeworms  
 Veterinarian's letter or certificate confirming fitness to travel and/or no obvious signs of disease
 Government certification that the veterinarian's export documentation and certificates are in order for travel
In some countries, the formal passport is needed. Others will accept documentation in any form so long as it provides clear evidence of the procedure being followed. Usually, the animal and its papers are checked thoroughly upon both departure and arrival.

A pet passport alone can be used to enter some countries if it records all relevant information (e.g., the UK), but it will not suffice to enter many countries. For instance Guatemala, in common with almost every country operating such a scheme, demands that all imported pets have a rabies vaccination, but will not accept the pet passport as proof of said vaccination. They require the proof of the rabies vaccination in the animal's records.

Tapeworm treatment must be administered by a vet not less than 24 hours and not more than 120 hours (1–5 days) before scheduled arrival time.

Specific country regulations

United Kingdom 
The rules for bringing pets into the UK can be quite complex. The official UK Government website covers this topic in detail.
Dogs, cats & ferrets with Pet Passports from EU (& some other) countries can enter the UK via specified routes and ferry companies, including the Channel Tunnel by car. Before entering the UK, most pet dogs (including assistance dogs), but not cats or ferrets, must be treated for tapeworm. The treatment must be administered by a vet not less than 24 hours and not more than 120 hours (1–5 days) before its scheduled arrival time in the UK. (There is no mandatory requirement for tick treatment.) No treatment is required for dogs entering the UK from Finland, Ireland, Norway or Malta.
All animals (except guide dogs) travelling by air to the UK must travel in the hold as manifest cargo & can only use specific airports and airlines. (Similar rules apply to pets arriving by sea, other than by specific ferry services.) British law precludes all animals entering the UK by air either in the cabin or in the hold as 'excess' or 'checked' baggage. Most airlines do not offer cargo services to individual passengers directly and specialist agents are normally used. UK law does not prohibit the transport of dogs and cats in the cabin or as hold baggage when departing from the UK, but restrictions may be imposed by individual airlines or destination countries. See Other useful information below for further travel details. Swiss Airlines publishes a useful guide which is typical of the services proposed by several European airlines.

Japan 
Although a participant in the PETs scheme, to bring pets into Japan from member states there are several separate procedures that must be followed. These do not cover Iceland, Australia, New Zealand, Fiji, Hawaii and Guam, which have designated region (rabies free) status. If you take a pet out of Japan, it may take between 6 months to a year for it to re-enter. Including prior contact with Japanese Quarantine several months before entry:
 The dog or cat must be microchipped.
 The dog or cat must have stayed in the country for at least 180 days (6 months) since its birth or having left Japan.
 The dog or cat must have had 2 rabies injections and a blood test 6 month before entering/re-entering Japan, proving the pet is free of rabies. This test must be carried out at a designated laboratory.
 The dog or cat does not have or show signs of rabies or Leptospirosis (dogs only).

To take a dog or cat out of Japan, on top of the necessary injections and microchip, you must:
 Have certificates issued by an official vet to prove that your dog/cat has been vaccinated, microchipped and wormed as necessary. These are vets designated by the prefecture as able to issue certificates and officially vaccinate your dog. 
 More than a week before travelling, notify Animal Quarantine Service at the port of departure, and apply for an export inspection for your dog/ cat. The inspection will be carried out by the Quarantine Office (Ken'eki-kyoku) before you check your pet in.

Other useful information 

The PETS scheme is not yet standardised. This leads to much confusion. Every journey between any two countries should be researched separately to ensure that the animal will be accepted for travel upon arrival at the departure point.

 The major delay in obtaining a pet passport is the time required for the rabies vaccination. The implications are:
 An animal may get a valid rabies vaccination and serology check, and then apply for a passport on the spot, at a later date.
 An animal whose rabies vaccination is allowed to go out of date (typically 1–2 years) by even one day, without a booster, must start with a new vaccination and delay.
 Because PETS is European wide, the regulations may differ for travel within, and outside, Europe. Pet owners should take care since the requirements for travel to a destination may be quite different from the requirements upon returning.
 A suitable and carrier-approved travel crate may be required, which must have the correct food and water containers as set out by the relevant bodies.
 Animals should not be sedated for air travel since altitude can affect medications. Most airlines will not accept tranquilised animals. Instead, they are kept in a dark, heated, pressurized hold, which encourages them to sleep for the duration of travel.
 Larger animals may be restricted to airline routes which can accommodate their crates. Not all airlines will carry animals, and charges vary widely.
 Some routes will not fly animals if the temperature is adverse
 Many airlines are unable to provide details of formal procedures, you may need to check with a vet or the consulate of the relevant countries to confirm details.
 Since airline staff are often (at present) poorly trained or uncertain, and conflicting information may be provided, at present it is sensible to double check and document all information supplied.
 On some airlines, animals may travel as excess baggage or cargo. "Excess baggage" (in effect treating the crate and animal as another suitcase)  ensures they travel on the same flight and is often much cheaper.
 The UK restricts incoming flights to ship animals as cargo. A cheaper alternative around this aberration in the rules is to fly to some other European city, such as Paris or Amsterdam, and then travel to the UK by rail or ferry instead, which do not have this restriction. Passengers travelling with animals by rail or ferry to or from the UK must in many cases need to have access to a vehicle, as you cannot currently take animals directly on foot by Eurostar, and neither on most ferry routes. After arriving in Europe from a non-EU participating country, the certificate received from customs/quarantine is valid for Europe wide travel for up to 4 months, though it is best to contact DEFRA directly prior to travel.

See also 
 Pet travel

References

Bibliography

External links 

 EU website: Movement of Pets
 Rules for importing pets to the United Kingdom
 EU regulations on pet movement Q&A
 RTÉ News report on Pet Passports (RealPlayer video stream)
 EuroNews report on Pet Passports (RealPlayer video stream)

 Ship-a-Pet-to-the-UK - A detailed article on shipping a pet to the UK from overseas (particularly from US).

Passports
Law of the United Kingdom
Dog law
Pets